The Inter-American Convention Against the Illicit Manufacturing of and Trafficking in Firearms, Ammunition, Explosives, and Other Related Materials  (CIFTA), originally the Inter-American Convention Against Illicit Firearms Trafficking in the Americas, is an international firearms control treaty.

History
CIFTA as a program was approved during the First Plenary Session of the OAS held on November 13, 1997. Its purpose was to establish a regional standard for the control of the illicit manufacturing and trafficking in firearms: the Inter-American Convention against the Illicit Manufacturing and Trafficking in Firearms, Ammunition, Explosives and Other Related Materiales. CIFTA emphasizes the need for authorizations or licenses of export, imports and transit; the reinforcement of the checkpoints for exports, amongst other things. The Convention thus seeks to promote and facilitate the cooperation and exchange of information and experiences between OAS Member States. The Convention established a Consultative Committee gathering a representative for each State Party in order to guarantee its implementation, to promote the exchange of information, to facilitate cooperation and foster training between States.

The treaty entered into force in 1998.

Membership
As of 2013, the treaty has been ratified by 31 of the 34 states in the OAS. The states that have not ratified the treaty are Canada, Jamaica, and the United States. Each of the three non-ratifying states are signatories to it.

United States

U.S. President Barack Obama has proposed that the U.S. Senate ratify CIFTA.
Opponents are concerned that the measures contained within CIFTA could criminalize activities such as reloading ammunition if they are done without a license. Other provisions make unlicensed modification to any weapon a serious crime. Furthermore, there are provisions that expand infractions to larger groups of people effectively holding an organization responsible for the actions of a single member.

See also
 Arms trafficking
 Assault Weapons Ban and Law Enforcement Protection Act of 2007
 Firearm case law
 Violent Crime Control and Law Enforcement Act
 Gun (Firearm) laws in the United States (by state)
 Gun Control Act of 1968
 Gun politics in the United States
 Political arguments of gun politics in the United States
 Organization of American States

References

External links
 OAS Disarmament Page Committee on Hemispheric Security

Treaties concluded in 1997
Organization of American States treaties
Treaties entered into force in 1998
Treaties of Antigua and Barbuda
Treaties of Argentina
Treaties of the Bahamas
Treaties of Barbados
Treaties of Belize
Treaties of Bolivia
Treaties of Brazil
Treaties of Chile
Treaties of Colombia
Treaties of Costa Rica
Treaties of Dominica
Treaties of the Dominican Republic
Treaties of Ecuador
Treaties of El Salvador
Treaties of Grenada
Treaties of Guatemala
Treaties of Guyana
Treaties of Haiti
Treaties of Honduras
Treaties of Mexico
Treaties of Nicaragua
Treaties of Panama
Treaties of Paraguay
Treaties of Peru
Treaties of Saint Kitts and Nevis
Treaties of Saint Lucia
Treaties of Saint Vincent and the Grenadines
Treaties of Trinidad and Tobago
Treaties of Suriname
Treaties of Uruguay
Treaties of Venezuela
Arms trafficking treaties
Firearm laws
1997 in Washington, D.C.